Catoplatus is a genus of true bugs belonging to the family Tingidae.

The genus was first described by Spinola in 1837.

Species include:
 Catoplatus disparis Drake & Maa, 1954
 Catoplatus distinctus Montandon, 1895
 Catoplatus fabricii (Stål, 1868)

References

Tingidae